An inflatable building is a structure constructed using two layers of membrane connected together, typically using spars made from the same material. The cavity formed between the layers is pressurized with air producing a rigid structural element which allows large span structures to be achieved. The key difference between air-supported buildings and inflatable buildings is that air-supported buildings require airlocks at all the access points to prevent air being lost when doors are opened since the entire occupied space of the building is pressurized. Inflatable buildings like this commonly serve sports, such as tennis and indoor golf.

Structure

An inflatable building only requires pressurized air within the cavities of the walls and so does not require airlocks since the occupied interior of the building is at normal atmospheric pressure.

The air contained within the walls of an inflatable building becomes a true structural part of the building. The membranes used in the construction of such buildings are typically less than 1mm thick, so the amount of membrane used compared to the volume of air contained within the walls is incredibly low (typically less than 0.5%).  This makes inflatable buildings efficient in terms of the amount of raw materials required to construct them.

The small amount of material used in the construction of inflatable buildings makes them highly portable. When a building needs to be moved, the air can simply be allowed to escape enabling an entire building to be packed into a small volume compared to its inflated size. The building can then be transported easily to its new location and re-inflated.

Types
Inflatable structures and inflatable buildings are used in many ways including membrane roofs and covers, sails, buildings and pavilions, airships, furniture, airspace structures, boats, escape slides, security mattresses, swimming pools, coverings, games and castles, air bags and many other applications. Examples include an inflatable church and an inflatable pub.

See also
 List of inflatable manufactured goods

References

External links
 

Buildings and structures by type
Inflatable manufactured goods
Portable buildings and shelters